Events in the year 2022 in Mauritania.

Incumbents
President: Mohamed Ould Ghazouani
Prime Minister: Mohamed Ould Bilal

Events

Deaths

References

 
2020s in Mauritania
Years of the 21st century in Mauritania
Mauritania
Mauritania